The Cartersville City School District is a public school district in Bartow County, Georgia, United States, based in Cartersville. It serves the city of Cartersville in Bartow County.

The school board maintains schools for pre-school to grade twelve. There is one primary school, one elementary school, a middle school, and a high school. The district has 226 full-time teachers and over 3,940 students.

Schools

The Cartersville City School District has two elementary schools, one middle school, and one high school.

Elementary schools 
Cartersville Elementary School
Cartersville Primary School

Middle school
Cartersville Middle School

High school
Cartersville High School

References

External links
Cartersville City School District

School districts in Georgia (U.S. state)
Education in Bartow County, Georgia